The 2014–15 ProA, was the 8th season of the ProA, the second level of basketball in Germany. The champions and finalists of the league of the Playoffs were promoted to the 2015–16 Basketball Bundesliga. Gießen 46ers won its first ProA title.

Teams
Relegated from the 2013–14 Basketball Bundesliga
S.Oliver Baskets
SC Rasta Vechta
Promoted from the ProB
Baskets Akademie Weser-Ems Oldenburger TB
Bike-Café Messingschlager
Offered a wild card
Hamburg Towers

Standings

|}

Playoffs

References

ProA seasons
Germany
2014–15 in German basketball leagues